Lyces vulturata is a moth of the  family Notodontidae. It is found on high-altitudes in Peru

It is involved in Müllerian mimicry with the arctiid Crocomela flammifera.

External links
Species page at Tree of Life project

Notodontidae
Moths described in 1904